The women's six-red snooker team tournament at the 2010 Asian Games in Guangzhou took place from 13 November to 14 November at the Asian Games Town Gymnasium.

No seeding was used for the draw.

Schedule
All times are China Standard Time (UTC+08:00)

Results

Last 16

Quarterfinals

Semifinals

Final

Non-participating athletes

References 
Results
Draw

External links 
 Cue Sports results from the official site of the Games - archived at archive.org

Cue sports at the 2010 Asian Games